Lightning Warrior Raidy is a dungeon-crawling RPG Eroge developed by ZyX, and later translated to English by G-Collections.

Gameplay

The game uses traditional turn-based battles as its gameplay base while telling its narrative though visual novel-styled story and momentary gameplay cutscenes. At various times throughout the game, the player can either instigate or fall victim of various erotic scenes themed after yuri eroticism.

Plot

Raidy, a wandering sword fighter roaming the land of Else, stops at the small village of Sadd to resupply. When she arrived, she notes as though she arrived at a grave town due to only elderly living in the area. The locals tell her all the youth, especially young women have all been abducted from the village and imprisoned by the monsters in the tower nearby. Raidy decided to help the people and investigates the tower to rescue the captives.

Characters 

: The protagonist of the game, a warrior with the mysterious power to control lightning.

Development and release
The game was first released in Japan under the title  on September 20, 1994 for MS-DOS. A version for FM Towns and PC-9821 was released on October 7 of the same year, and a Windows 3.1 edition came out on August 23, 1996.

The game was remade for Windows XP with the title  on August 12, 2005. On October 26, 2012, a bundle for containing all three games in the series on DVD-ROM for Windows XP, Windows Vista, and Windows 7 was released, entitled . 

On May 14, 2007, G-Collections, an affiliate brand of JAST USA, announced that it had acquired the rights to release Lightning Warrior Raidy in English along with Snow Sakura, and that development had already begun. At that time, the release was planned for "mid- to late 2007". However, English production didn't finish until May 13, 2008, when G-Collections announced that the game had hit "golden master" status. Even before Lightning Warrior Raidy was available for sale, G-Collections had already revealed their plans to translate the sequel, Lightning Warrior Raidy II.

Reception

In a review for Destructoid, Karen Gellender wrote: "So I'm probably not a good judge of this sort of thing, but my guess is that LWR is neither good hentai, or a particularly good dungeon crawler.... However, I couldn't in good conscience say that the title isn't entertaining. While it's very basic (think Etrian Odyssey without the mapping features), the actual gameplay is solid enough, and the artwork is attractive."

Adaptations
A manga adaptation by Kazuma Sonsei was released in 2014.

Sequel

References

External links 
 ZyX page: Windows 3.1 version, Windows 98 version 
 G-Collections' product page
 JAST USA page
 ZyX's product page 
 
 MobyGames page: DOS version and Winodws 98 version

1994 video games
DOS games
Fantasy video games
FM Towns games
Japanese role-playing video games
NEC PC-9801 games
Single-player video games
Video game remakes
Video games developed in Japan
Video games featuring female protagonists
Windows games
ZyX (brand) games

ja:雷の戦士ライディ